A Jackson in Your House is a 1969 album by the Art Ensemble of Chicago recorded for the French BYG Actuel label. It features performances by Lester Bowie, Joseph Jarman, Roscoe Mitchell and Malachi Favors Maghostut. When issued on CD by Affinity in 1989, the track "The Waltz" was replaced by a six-minute live excerpt (of unknown provenance) entitled "Hey Friend" which has never reappeared on any subsequent reissue.

Reception

The AllMusic review by Thom Jurek awarded the album 4 stars noting that "A Jackson in Your House is not the finest or most revelatory recording by the Art Ensemble of Chicago, but it is one of their more entertaining and carefree outings". Dominique Leone of Pitchfork called the music "a direct indication of the kind of projects the musicians had previously been involved with: free improvisation; counterpoint and modern European classical music; traditionally minded attempts to integrate African music into their sound; a significant theatric influence" and concluded, "This is heady stuff, and though I can hear the dedication in the performance, sometimes the feeling loses me". Reviewing the 2013 reissue, Lloyd Sachs of Jazz Times said, "A Jackson in Your House is highlighted by the circus-like title track; 'Ericka', a coolly charged, marimba-dappled, spoken-word declamation on '60s themes; and 'Song for Charles', a long, lyrical tribute to the band's recently deceased compadre Charles Clark".

Track listing
All compositions by Roscoe Mitchell except as indicated

Personnel
Lester Bowie: trumpet, percussion instruments
Malachi Favors Maghostut: bass, percussion instruments, vocals
Joseph Jarman: saxophones, clarinets, percussion instruments
Roscoe Mitchell: saxophones, clarinets, flute, percussion instruments

References

Art Ensemble of Chicago albums
1969 albums
BYG Actuel albums